The Lozna is a right tributary of the river Rusca in Romania. It starts at the confluence of headwaters Lozna Mare and Lozna Mică in the Poiana Ruscă Mountains. It flows into the Rusca in Rusca Montană.

References

Rivers of Romania
Rivers of Caraș-Severin County